Adejeania armata is a species of tachinid flies in the genus Adejeania of the family Tachinidae.

References 

armata
Insects described in 1830